Actinor is a Himalayan genus of butterflies in the family Hesperiidae. It is monotypic, being represented by the single species Actinor radians, the veined dart.

Description

Wingspan of 1.5 inches.

Distribution

Status
It is not rare.

Cited references

See also
Hesperiidae
List of butterflies of India (Hesperiinae)
List of butterflies of India (Hesperiidae)

References
 
 
 Tree of Life Web Project .
 

Astictopterini
Butterflies of Asia
Monotypic butterfly genera
Butterflies described in 1878
Taxa named by Edward Yerbury Watson
Hesperiidae genera